Reliance College Junior, established in 2003, is an English medium college in Golaghat. It has three streams i.e. science, arts and commerce. It has produced three state toppers belonging to the top ten students of AHSEC HSSLC exam yet.

References

Junior colleges in India
High schools and secondary schools in Assam
Schools in Golaghat
Educational institutions established in 2003
2003 establishments in Assam